This is a list of people executed for witchcraft, many of whom were executed during organized witch-hunts, particularly during the 15th–18th centuries. Large numbers of people were prosecuted for witchcraft in Europe between 1560 and 1630.

Background
Until around 1440, witchcraft-related prosecutions in Europe centered on maleficium, the concept of using supernatural powers specifically to harm others. Cases came about from accusations of the use of ritual magic to damage rivals. Until the early 15th century, there was little association of witchcraft with Satan. From that time organized witch-hunts increased, as did individual accusations of sorcery. The nature of the charges brought changed as more cases were linked to diabolism. Throughout the century, several treatises were published that helped to establish a stereotype of the witch, particularly the Satanic connection. During the 16th century, witchcraft prosecutions stabilized and even declined in some areas. Witch-hunts increased again in the 17th century. The witch trials in Early Modern Europe included the Basque witch trials in Spain, the Fulda witch trials in Germany, the North Berwick witch trials in Scotland, and the Torsåker witch trials in Sweden.

There were also witch-hunts during the 17th century in the American colonies. These were particularly common in the colonies of Massachusetts, Connecticut, and New Haven. The myth of the witch had a strong cultural presence in 17th century New England and, as in Europe, witchcraft was strongly associated with devil-worship. About eighty people were accused of practicing witchcraft in a witch-hunt that lasted throughout New England from 1647 to 1663. Thirteen women and two men were executed. The Salem witch trials followed in 1692–93, culminating in the executions of 20 people. Five others died in jail.

It has been estimated that tens of thousands of people were executed for witchcraft in Europe and the American colonies over several hundred years. The exact number is unknown, but modern conservative scholars estimate around 40,000–50,000. Scholar Carlo Ginzburg of the University of Bologna, in his work Night Battles, estimates the number between 3-4 million people. Common methods of execution for convicted witches were hanging, drowning and burning. Burning was often favored, particularly in Europe, as it was considered a more painful way to die. Prosecutors in the American colonies generally preferred hanging in cases of witchcraft.

List of people executed for witchcraft

Images

Notes

Hannah Jones: tried for witchcraft but found innocent, however three years later found guilty but the community couldn't find her.

References
Footnotes

 Sources

Witchcraft